Argentina competed at the 1960 Winter Olympics in Squaw Valley, United States.  The nation returned to the Winter Games after missing the 1956 Winter Olympics. Argentina got to lead the Parade of Nations in Greece's absence.

Alpine skiing

Men

Women

Cross-country skiing

Men

References
Official Olympic Reports
 Olympic Winter Games 1960, full results by sports-reference.com

Nations at the 1960 Winter Olympics
1960
1960 in Argentine sport